The Z9/10 Beijing-Hangzhou Through Train is Chinese railway running between the capital Beijing to Hangzhou, capital of Zhejiang express passenger trains by the Beijing Railway Bureau, Hangzhou passenger segment responsible for passenger transport task, Hangzhou originating on the Beijing train. 25T Type Passenger trains running along the Hukun Railway and Jinghu Railway across Zhejiang, Shanghai, Jiangsu, Anhui, Shandong, Hebei, Tianjin, Beijing and other provinces and cities, the entire 1633 km. Beijing railway station to Hangzhou railway station running 13 hours and 53 minutes, use trips for Z9; Hangzhou railway station to Beijing railway station to run 13 hours and 40 minutes, use trips for Z10.

Carriages

Locomotives

Timetable

References 

Passenger rail transport in China
Rail transport in Beijing
Rail transport in Zhejiang